Rosa von Milde, also Rosalie von Milde, née Rosa Agthe (25 June 1827 – 25 January 1906) was a German operatic soprano and voice teacher. She was a leading singer at the Weimar Court Theatre from 1848 to 1867, which flourished when Franz Liszt directed it. She created, among others, the roles of Elsa in Wagner's Lohengrin, conducted by Liszt in 1850, and Margiana in Der Barbier von Bagdad by Peter Cornelius in 1858.

Life 
Agthe was born on 25 June 1827 into a music-loving family in Weimar. Her father , a chamber musician, gave her piano lessons at a young age. When her singing talent was recognised, she took voice lessons for three years with the tenor Franz Götze (1814–1888). On 9 June 1845, she made her stage debut at the Weimarer Hoftheater (Weimar Court Theatre) as Amina in Bellini's La sonnambula.

She made her official debut as a permanent singer at the Hoftheater in September 1848 in the title role of Louis Spohr's Jessonda. She had great success with roles in Richard Wagner's stage works. She appeared as Elisabeth in Tannhäuser. On 28 August 1850, she performed as Elsa in Lohengrin in the work's world premiere, conducted by Franz Liszt. Her future husband, the baritone Hans Feodor von Milde, performed as Telramund. Liszt commented: 

The couple married in 1851. They had two children, Franz von Milde and Rudolf von Milde (1859–1927), who also became singers, and an adopted daughter, Natalie von Milde. The couple often appeared together on stage, for example in 1852 as Teresa and Fieramosca in the first German production of Benvenuto Cellini by Berlioz, in an arrangement by Liszt.  In 1854, Milde participated in the world premieres of both Heinrich Dorn's Die Nibelungen and Schubert's Alfonso und Estrella. She created the role of Margiana in Der Barbier von Bagdad by Peter Cornelius in 1858. Cornelius dedicated his composition 12 Sonette für Rosa von Milde to her in 1859. On 21 May 1865, she created the role of Chimene in his Der Cid, while her husband appeared as Ruy Diaz.

In 1867, Rosa von Milde took her leave from the Weimar stage. The reason was personal differences between her and the new artistic director Franz von Dingelstedt. She then worked as a voice teacher and from 1876 at the Weimarer Musikschule. 

Rosa von Milde died in Weimar on 25 January 1906 at the age of 78.

Note

References

Further reading 
 Ulrike Müller: Die klugen Frauen von Weimar. Regentinnen, Salondamen, Schriftstellerinnen und Künstlerinnen. Elisabeth Sandmann, Munich, 2007
 Natalie von Milde: Briefe in Poesie und Prosa von Peter Cornelius an Theodor und Rosa von Milde. Weimar (1901)
 Franz von Milde: Ein ideales Künstlerehepaar, Rosa und Feodor von Milde. Ihre Kunst und ihre Zeit. Munich (1918)

External links 

 Rosa von Milde (1827–1906) (image) museum-digital.de
 Teilnachlass von Rosa und Hans Feodor von Milde Bayerische Staatsbibliothek
 Rosa von Milde findagrave.com

German operatic sopranos
Voice teachers
1827 births
1906 deaths
Musicians from Weimar
Lohengrin